Gámeza is a town and municipality in the Colombian Department of Boyacá, part of the Sugamuxi Province, a subregion of Boyacá.

History 
Before the Spanish conquest of the Muisca in the 1530s, Gámeza was inhabited first by indigenous groups during the Herrera Period and later part of the Muisca Confederation, the former country of the Muisca in the central highlands (Altiplano Cundiboyacense) of Colombia. The confederation was ruled by zaques in Hunza (present-day Tunja), zipas in Bacatá and caciques of other villages. Gámeza was part of the reign of the iraca of Sugamuxi, currently known as Sogamoso.

With the election of a new ruler of Sugamuxi, the cacique of Gámeza was consulted, together with the leaders of Busbanzá, Toca, Boyacá and Pesca among the nobles of Firavitoba and Tobasía. In case of conflict, the ruler of Tundama would intervene.

The first Europeans encountering the Muisca were the troops led by conquistador Gonzalo Jiménez de Quesada in 1537. The last zaque beaten by the Spanish soldiers was Aquiminzaque whose primary wife was the daughter of the cacique of Gámeza.

Gámeza was conquered and Spanish missionaries were sent to convert the indigenous people to catholicism. On November 4, 1585 Gámeza was properly founded.

The name Gámeza comes from Gamza, name of the cacique of the village. Gá and za in the Chibcha language of the Muisca mean "serf of the Sun" and "night" respectively.

Geography 
Gámeza is located in the Eastern Ranges of the Colombian Andes. In the area gold deposits are present and the Chicamocha River originates in Gámeza.

Economy 
Main economical activities in Gámeza are dairy farming and agriculture; potatoes, peas, maize, wheat and barley. Coal mining forms another important source of income for the villagers.

Gallery

References 

Municipalities of Boyacá Department
Populated places established in 1585
1585 establishments in the Spanish Empire
Muisca Confederation
Muysccubun